Gary John Previts (born 1942) is an American accountant, a Distinguished University Professor at Case Western Reserve University (Cleveland, Ohio USA) and Professor of Accountancy in the Weatherhead School of Management. He is known for his work on the history of the theory and practice of accountancy.

Biography

Youth, education and military service 
Previts was born in Cleveland, Ohio, where his father, a graduate from Teachers College, Columbia University worked as an educator. He obtained his BA from John Carroll University, under the guidance of Professor of Accounting F.J. McGurr, in 1963. In 1964 he obtained his MA in accountancy at the Ohio State University, and in 1972 under the guidance of Williard E. Stone, his PhD at the University of Florida. He obtained the CPA designation in both Ohio and Alabama.

In 2012 he acquired the Chartered Global Management Accountant (CGMA) designation through the AICPA Pathway.

Previts served in the US Army (1965–67) during the Vietnam War, where he was stationed in Thailand during 1967. Back in the States he worked at Haskins & Sells, now Deloitte, before continuing on to his doctoral study.

Career 
Following his military service he was a professor at Augusta College, Georgia [now Augusta University]. After completing his doctoral studies Previts accepted an appointment at University of Alabama in 1973. During the first year of his academic career, Previts was instrumental in generating interest in and in the formation of the Academy of Accounting Historians, devoted to the study of accounting history.

He was first President of the Academy of Accounting Historians and a founding editor of the Accounting Historians Journal in 1974. He served as President of the American Accounting Association (2007–8). He has served for thirty years as the editor of Research in Accounting Regulation.   In 1979, Previts was appointed a Professor of Accountancy in the Weatherhead School of Management at Case Western Reserve University, where from 2007 to 2022 he held an appointment as the E. Mandell deWindt Professor.

Previts was inducted into the Accounting Hall of Fame in 2011. In that same year he was given the title Distinguished University Professor at CWRU.  In 2007 he received the American Institute of Certified Public Accountants Gold Medal for Service. in 2018 the American Accounting Association (2007–8) awarded him a lifetime service award.

Personal 
Previts is married to Frances Anne (Porubsky) a graduate of Notre Dame College, South Euclid, Ohio. She was a research associate in hypertensive research at the Cleveland Clinic and the Medical College of Georgia, prior to dedicating her time to the development of their children.  They have four adult children and eleven grandchildren.

Work

Institutional development of accounting 
Previts' research interests are varied and include studies of regulatory institutions, biographical studies and focus on the "development of accounting thought and institutions... the corporate origins and ongoing events that have shaped contemporary accounting practices... [and on] the regulation of accounting disclosures." Previts and several coauthors have consistently contributed to the literature of the discipline.

His most frequent coauthor is Professor Dale Flesher, of the University of Mississippi an accomplished, brilliant and hard-working scholar.  He also wrote several papers with the late Professors Edward N. Coffman and William Samson.

In addition to faculty mentors noted above, he studied historical topics with Professor William Woodruff, while at the University of Florida. Woodruff's works including The Impact of Western Man, America's Impact on the World, Vessel of Sadness, and a Concise History of the Modern World, are among the writings which Previts identifies as influential in developing views which he employs.

Also while a student in the PhD program at the University of Florida, Previts took coursework from both Harvey Theodore Deinzer, a pupil of William A. Paton of Michigan and then a professor at Florida and Lawrence Benninger, a student of DR Scott, University of Missouri, then a professor at Florida.

From Deinzer he gained an appreciation for the pragmaticism of John Dewey, and from Deinzer's work Development of Accounting Thought (Holt Rinehart 1965) he gained an appreciation for Dewey's truth definition of "warranted assertabililty".  Benninger's dedication to the works of Scott led Previts to
an awareness of the ‘cultural significance of accounting’ paraphrasing the title of DR Scott's well known work.  Previous to Previts studies at Florida in the early 1970s, two earlier doctoral recipients Robert R. Sterling and Richard Vangermeersch, would also be important sources of support and knowledge.

Sterling would have by this time become strongly influenced by Thomas Kuhn's work on scientific revolutions, and Sterling's support for taking up new approaches to thinking were influential.  Vangermeersch, who spent his career at the University of Rhode Island, pioneered many important studies and published extensively, leading up to his coeditorship of the 1996 Garland volume, The History of Accounting: An International Encyclopedia.

Early development 
Previts attended the first American Accounting Association doctoral consortium at the University of Kentucky in 1971 and met many of the up-and-coming academics of that era at that event. Upon his first academic appointment at the University of Alabama, Previts was mentored by S. Paul Garner, who along with W. Baker Flowers and Robert Sweeney, two other doctoral alums of the University of Texas at Austin, were supportive of historical work, at a time when a focused mania for quantitative – empirical archival work was burgeoning.

Flowers arranged for Previts to conduct the doctoral seminar on accounting history at Alabama, and Garner was a guiding and supporting influence on Previts effort in establishing the Academy of Accounting Historians in 1973 at the formative meeting at Laval University in Quebec in 1973.  Sweeney as chair of the faculty led the establishment of the school of accounting at Alabama and supported Previts in developing roles at the American Institute of CPAs and in the American Accounting Association.

At Alabama Previts and Paul Garner were involved in supervising the dissertation of Barbara Dubis Merino, who later, with Previts, co-authored the first two versions of a history of accounting in the United States, first published by Ronald Press in 1979 and then revised and published by The Ohio State University Press in 1998.
 
While a master of accounting student at The Ohio State University Previts met Lawrence Phillips, a doctoral candidate who had received his prior degrees at Case Western Reserve University(CWRU)  in Previts home town of Cleveland, Ohio.  In February 1979 Phillips contacted Previts and encouraged him to consider an appointment at CWRU.  Dean Theodore Alfred and Previts reviewed the possibilities for establishing a Professional Accountancy Program at CWRU to provide a Master of Accountancy degree.

Professor at CWRU 
Previts was appointed a full professor on the CWRU faculty in the summer of 1979, with very mixed feelings about leaving Alabama colleagues, friends and neighbors.  Yet he perceived an opportunity to work to develop the accountancy programs at CWRU, a member school of the Association of American Universities (AAU), which Andrew D. Braden, who was approaching retirement, had been overseeing for many years.

At CWRU Previts took over the advanced financial theory seminar transforming it into a critical thinking focused offering, with an emphasis on appreciation for the role of theory in accounting practice and in developing recognition for the role of history in understanding contemporary issues.  He has been involved in that course and in the doctoral seminar in accounting history over the forty-plus years on the faculty at CWRU.

He especially learned from colleagues such as Bob Colson, an Ohio State PHD, whose career would span many organizational and editorial roles, and Scott S. Cowen, an accounting colleague who became the school's dean, and later President of Tulane University. Bob impressed upon Previts the importance of tenure as the equivalent of 'equity ownership' and a responsibility not merely an earned privilege. Cowen impressed upon him the role of contingency theory, and the need to have multiple courses of action or options for any important course of change.

Timothy Fogarty who came to the faculty a decade later was a constant source of intellectual activity, and provided a sociological perspective to accounting research. Larry Parker was a central figure in supporting the development of graduate study in accounting. These two colleagues' signature thoughts are ascribed to these years.

In addition, during this time, his consideration of the writings of the late Professors Michael Chatfield, and a relationship with the late Professor Orace Johnson occurred.  Both were impressive scholars.  While they were not campus colleagues, Previts learned much from observing them at a first gathering with both at the AAA meetings at the University of Kentucky mentioned earlier.

It was there that he first identified the simple relationship which exists between what “WAS” (historical perspective), what “IS” (positivist thinking) and what “OUGHT TO BE” (normative thinking).  He based his teaching upon pointing out to students that relationships between what “WAS” and what “IS” and what “OUGHT” to be are necessary to permit a comprehensive understanding of what is truthful.

During this period, Richard Mattessich shared with Previts the writings of Percy Williams Bridgman (1882–1961), in particular, the paper in the Yale Review during WW2 wherein Bridgman defined his view of the scientific method as “doing one’s damndest with one’s mind, no holds barred.”  This view, and pragmatism opened in Previts' mind, an appreciation for the need for entrepreneurial intellectual activities, not merely compliant doctrinaire approaches to truth seeking.

While team-teaching an MBA history course on American business in the 1990s and early 2000s, Previts met and worked with David Hammack of the CWRU History Faculty and Eric Neilsen, a colleague in Weatherhead's organizational behavior area.  For a decade Previts steeped himself not only in the financial and capital market aspects of US history but in the work areas of these two colleagues which included writings of Alfred D. Chandler, Jr., whom Previts had corresponded with since the 1970s, and also the writings of John Steele Gordon, which provided materials which Previts would employ in advanced undergraduate seminars on the topic.

These broader views of historical context and their implications for accounting history became fully appreciated over time. They led to the explication that the notions of property rights and human rights as enabled and evolving. These rights are fundamental to the culture and social contracts of the U.S. system. And more recently, having read James Fenimore Cooper's The American Democrat (1838, p. 42), he recognized the premise that the right to own private productive property did not extend to ownership of human beings. Further reflection upon the notion of implied inalienable rights let to papers published in Research in Accounting Regulation in the 1990s  about an important "right to information" needed to insure that the investing public as ultimate capital providers of the late 20th and 21st century were given relevant and timely information on the use and performance of their capital in the equity-driven markets.

The notion of information rights as a source theory for accounting disclosures in today's capital markets was supported in his reflections of the writings of Thomas McCraw and in McCraw's award-winning work, Prophets of Regulation. In particular he found the work of Charles Francis Adams and McCraw's view that effective regulation involved developing a rationale for the "public use of private interests" to be meaningful. During the 30 years which Previts served as editor of Research in Accounting Regulation (Elsevier), he attempted to develop awareness of the notion of information rights and also of the interface between regulation and accounting practice.

He leveraged the advice once given to him by Katherine Schipper as to editorial attitudes, which Schipper had attributed to e.e.cummings, namely to assess whether a manuscripts was new, true and interesting.  During periods of administrative service at CWRU as both a department chair for 10 years and an associate dean for 13 years, Previts shared his experiences in a unique ‘Decalogue’ of best practices derived from his early experiences.  The most important perhaps may have been to remind administrators that if there was something important they wanted to recall they should WRITE IT DOWN, especially with regard to resource allocations!

His professional service and activities include as a research team leader for the AICPA Jenkins Committee in the 1990s, and a research team leader for the Financial Accounting Standards Boards' disclosure study 2000-2. As part of his AICPA service he worked with other members as the convener of a group which developed the protocol to extend the recognition of authoritative standing for accounting standards to the Federal Accounting Standards Advisory Board [FASAB] in 1998-9.  He served as the chair of the Human Capital subcommittee of the U.S. Treasury's Advisory Committee on the Auditing Profession in 2007-8. Additional service included President of the Ohio Society of CPAs 1993-4, and AICPA Board Member 1995-97. Along with other key individuals including Dr. George Krull, Dr. Tracey Sutherland and Dennis Reigle, he assisted in the formation and oversight of the activities of the Pathways Commission, formed by the AICPA and the American Accounting Association [AAA], an activity which was chaired by Professor Bruce Behn, University of Tennessee 2010-2012. Along with others he served as a member of the Accountability Advisory Council of the United States General Accountability Office, beginning in 2002.  He served in a similar capacity for the Public Company Accounting Oversight Board [PCAOB] for many years.

Selected publications 
 Previts, Gary John. The Scope of CPA Services: A Study of the Development of the Concept of Independence and the Profession's Role in Society. Ronald Press, 1985.
 Magill, Harry T., and Gary John Previts. CPA professional responsibilities: An introduction. South-Western Pub, 1991.
 Coffman, Edward N., Rasoul H. Tondkar, and Gary John Previts. Historical perspectives of selected financial accounting topics. Richard D. Irwin, Inc., 1993.
 Previts, Gary John, and Barbara D. Merino. History of Accountancy in the United States: The Cultural Significance of Accounting. Ohio State University Press, 1998.

Articles, a selection
 Previts, Gary John, Lee D. Parker, and Edward N. Coffman. "Accounting history: definition and relevance." Abacus 26.1 (1990): 1-16.
 Previts, Gary John, Lee D. Parker, and Edward N. Coffman. "An accounting historiography: subject matter and methodology." Abacus 26.2 (1990): 136–158.
 Previts, G. J., Bricker, R. J., Robinson, T. R., & Young, S. J. "A content analysis of sell-side financial analyst company reports." Accounting Horizons 8 (1994): 55-55.
 Previts, Gary John, and Robert Bricker. "Fact and Theory in Accounting History: Presentmindedness and Capital Market Research*." Contemporary Accounting Research 10.2 (1994): 625–641.

References

External links 
 Gary Previts at Weatherhead School of Management
 Gary John Previts, The Accounting Hall of Fame.

1942 births
Living people
American accountants
American business theorists
Accounting academics
John Carroll University alumni
Ohio State University Fisher College of Business alumni
University of Florida alumni
University of Alabama faculty
Case Western Reserve University faculty
People from Cleveland